The Hundred of Macclesfield is a cadastral division of the County of Hindmarsh in South Australia. It lies in the Adelaide Hills and straddles the South Eastern Freeway. It is named after the Earl of Macclesfield while the aboriginal name used for the area covered by the hundred is reported to be Kangowirranilla, meaning 'place for kangaroos and water'. Within its bounds are the localities of Blakiston, Flaxley, Littlehampton, Macclesfield, Totness, parts of Bugle Ranges, Echunga, Gemmells, Green Hills Range, Meadows, Mount Barker, Mount Barker Junction, Mount Barker Summit, Nairne, Paris Creek, Strathalbyn and Wistow.

References

Macclesfield
1846 establishments in Australia